Dr. Heather Kessler, also known as Lady Heather, is a fictional character on the CBS crime drama CSI: Crime Scene Investigation, portrayed by Melinda Clarke.

This recurring character is a professional dominatrix and a potential romantic interest for then regular CSI supervisor Gil Grissom, as well as romantic rival to CSI forensic scientist Sara Sidle.

The character appears in six regular episodes of CSI and the two-hour finale TV movie.

Character creation 
Lady Heather was created by writer Jerry Stahl. He has written some of CSIs most controversial episodes, which have also sometimes been the most watched.

Melinda Clarke has said that she became interested in playing Lady Heather because of the contrasts embodied within the character:

a multidimensional person who hadn't been seen, a dominatrix who was much more evolved—enigmatic and empowered.

As noted in The Philosophy of TV Noir, Lady Heather is an "inspired variant" on the classic film noir femme fatale, with different aspects of her personality being explored over the course of multiple episodes.

Bill Keveney of USA Today nominates Lady Heather as a favorite of viewers, crediting "her ability to read the usually opaque Grissom".

Steven Cohan explores in his book on the series, Lady Heather as part of the show's "questioning of identity and the status of normality".

Appearances

"Slaves of Las Vegas"
Lady Heather is introduced in a 2001 episode as part of CSIs second season.  A murder occurs at Lady Heather's fetish club which the CSI team investigates. Previously unaware of the club and curious about Lady Heather's world, Gil Grissom finds himself intrigued and attracted to her.  She explains the lifestyle to him, and he admires her almost academic approach to human behavior.  During a conversation with Catherine about business earnings and women never giving up their power, Lady Heather reveals she has a daughter, Zoë, who's studying at Harvard.  Grissom is drawn to Heather's intellect, and both characters acknowledge an attraction to each other, and as the episode ends, some sexual tension begins to build, but neither acts on it.

William Petersen has said that his character, Grissom, is attracted to Lady Heather because they are "both anthropologists. He's fascinated by her [scientific look at] the sexual psyche of human beings."

"Lady Heather's Box"
In 2002, a year after Lady Heather's first appearance, she appeared again in CSI in its season three. This time, two murders, apparently unrelated, lead the CSIs to her club. The team is surprised to know that her business is going better than ever, and that she now has a website: LadyHeather.com, that she described as "Voyeurism in a Brave New World". To parallel the narrative of the episode, the real life URL pointed to a Lady Heather page, with a redirect to  the official CSI page at cbs.com.  The original page has since been taken down, but the URL still redirects to the CSI site.

In this episode, Lady Heather opens up a little bit more to Grissom, telling him that she has diabetes. During this episode, it is insinuated that Grissom might have slept with Lady Heather. They are both seen at her house at night, with Grissom approaching her in an intimate way, then it cuts to the next scene where they are both having tea during the day, wearing different clothes. The scene is very unclear, but William Petersen has said that his character did not sleep with Lady Heather, and Executive Producer Carol Mendelsohn and actress Marg Helgenberger have alluded to it, the latter dubbing their morning tea as "Grissom's version of the post-coital cigarette."

Near the end of the episode, Lady Heather becomes a suspect, and although she is later cleared, she seems disappointed that he ever suspected her, and their relationship is damaged by Grissom's suspicion.  Their intimacy is subdued until the 4th episode containing Lady Heather.

"Pirates of the Third Reich"

In 2006, four years after Lady Heather's second appearance, she comes back in CSIs season six.

This time Lady Heather's daughter Zoë has been murdered, and her body has been mutilated and dumped in the desert. She tells the CSIs that Zoë's father left her when she was pregnant. Heather also says that while Zoë was at Harvard, Zoë began seeing a psychiatrist and became pregnant with his child. Lady Heather's reporting of the psychiatrist to the AMA led to the estrangement of the mother and daughter.

As the episode unfolds, it's revealed that Zoë subsequently dropped out of college and eventually returned to Las Vegas. Zoë continued to refrain from contact with her mother, who did not know that she was in town until her face showed up on the news in an effort to identify her after her death. At Zoë's autopsy, Doc Robbins was unable to determine whether Zoë had given birth to her child due to decomposition already occurring.

Racked with grief, Lady Heather sleeps with the main suspect in the case so as to obtain a DNA sample from him. When it has been confirmed that he is in fact Zoë's murderer, Lady Heather abducts him and takes him to the desert where she starts whipping him until Grissom comes and stops her. Grissom stops her with a safeword – in "Lady Heather's Box," Lady Heather explains to Grissom that in a domination relationship, the slave is in control. This use of the domination code by Grissom points to the mutual understanding of the characters, and perhaps to the nature of the relation once enjoyed by both. The safeword indeed makes Heather stop and she takes brief solace in Grissom's arms.

Heather is arrested for assault, but is eventually released from jail by a judge, allegedly a client of hers. Her story is left unresolved.

"The Good, the Bad & the Dominatrix"
Airing in 2007, this episode takes place during CSIs seventh season, a year after the team last saw Lady Heather.

This time she has been the victim of what appears to be an attempted murder. She is reluctant to say who her attacker was. After another murder takes place, the truth is revealed: Lady Heather has hired an ex-cop to find her granddaughter, Allison, and when he finds her, Lady Heather attempts to gain custody of her. Jerome, Zoë's father, has also learned of Allison's existence and has sued for custody. Even though Heather sold her business in an effort to prove she could be a fit guardian, the court denied her custody and visitation rights.

Feeling that she had nothing left to live for, Heather sells the right to kill her to a man who has fantasized about killing women. She uses the money to set up a trust fund for Allison.

Her relationship with Grissom takes another turn, eliminating the sexual tension and evolving into a deeper, loving friendship. He is so deeply concerned about her state of mind that he spends the night at her house. Grissom meets with Jerome and asks him about the trust fund. He figures out that Lady Heather obtained the money from selling the right to kill her. Jerome is shocked. Grissom arranges a meeting between Jerome, Allison, and Lady Heather.

The episode ends with what seems to be a happier Lady Heather; she is no longer the cold vixen seen during her first appearance.

"Leave Out All the Rest"
2008, in CSIs ninth season, two years after Lady Heather's last appearance, Grissom, depressed and grieving over the loss of his relationship with Sara, pays an unexpected visit to Lady Heather, who has become a registered psychologist and practicing therapist.

The ostensible excuse for the visit is in connection with a murder that appears to be related to an S&M session gone wrong, but Heather suspects there is another reason, both for the murders and for Grissom's sudden reappearance in her life.  It would appear that she is correct on both counts; the episode ending is ambiguous, both in terms of the solution of the case, and in regard to the ever-changing and undefined nature of the relationship between Heather and Grissom.

"Unleashed"
Melinda Clarke reprises her role as Lady Heather in the Season 11 episode "Unleashed". In this episode, she is now a sex therapist who uses her real name which is Dr. Kessler. She helps Sara and Dr. Langston solve the case of a woman mauled to death by a mountain lion. The victim, a co-founder of a women's shelter, was one of Lady Heather's patients.

"Immortality"
Clarke reprises her role as Lady Heather in the finale movie alongside returning actors William Petersen and Marg Helgenberger, spurred by her initials "LHK" appearing on the handle of a key recovered from the first bomb site. Grissom reveals that his safeword with Lady Heather was "stop". It's revealed that her granddaughter had been killed in a hit-and-run before the episode.

Episode links
 Season 2 episode "Slaves of Las Vegas" (11-15-2001)
 Season 3 episode "Lady Heather's Box" (2-13-2003)
 Season 6 episode "Pirates of the Third Reich" (2-9-2006)
 Season 7 episode "The Good, the Bad, and the Dominatrix" (5-10-2007)
 Season 9 episode "Leave Out All the Rest" (11-6-2008)
 Season 11 episode "Unleashed" (4-7-2011)
 Series finale "Immortality" (9-27-2015)

References

External links 
 Lady Heather at the CSI Wiki

CSI: Crime Scene Investigation characters
Fictional dominatrices
Television characters introduced in 2001